10 Years Gone is a live album by blackgaze / post-metal band Deafheaven. It was recorded live-in-studio at The Atomic Garden Studio East in Oakland, California, and released on December 4, 2020, through Sargent House.

Background

10 Years Gone is the second live album released by Deafheaven (the band had previously released Live at The Blacktop, nearly a decade earlier, in 2011). The album was created in celebration of the band's 10-year anniversary, after the COVID-19 pandemic forced them to cancel a planned 10th anniversary tour.

10 Years Gone includes live renditions of songs that originally appeared on the band's demo EP ("Daedalus"), Roads to Judah ("Language Games"), Sunbather ("Vertigo", "The Pecan Tree", "Dreamhouse"), New Bermuda ("Baby Blue"), Ordinary Corrupt Human Love ("Glint"), and a non-album single ("From the Kettle Onto the Coil"). A live version of "Language Games" was previously released on Live at The Blacktop  The version of "From the Kettle Onto the Coil" featured in 10 Years Gone was the song's first physical release; previously, it was only available as a digital download.

Critical reception
Christina Wenig, reviewing the album for Louder Sound, gave it four stars out of five and called it "...a sonic portfolio that shows the impressive evolution of one of our present moment's most distinct metal bands..." She said that "10 Years Gone doesn't offer the energy, spontaneity and little mishaps that make the magic of an actual live album, but how could it? Ultimately, this record is the chronicle of a band reaching out to their community, to not only look back together, but to also push through an incredibly hard time for all of us."

Track listing

Personnel
Credits adapted from the liner notes of 10 Years Gone.

Deafheaven
 Kerry McCoy 
 Shiv Mehra 
 Daniel Tracy
 Christopher Johnson 
 George Clarke

Additional personnel
 Chelsea Jade Metcalf – album design
 Jack Shirley – producer, engineering, mixing, mastering
 Deafheaven – music, lyrics, producer
 Bobby Cochran – photography

Charts

References

External links
 10 Years Gone at Bandcamp (streamed copy where licensed)

2020 live albums
Deafheaven albums
Sargent House albums